Ivano-Hannivka is a rural settlement (a selyshche) in the Zaporizhzhia Raion (district) of Zaporizhzhia Oblast in southern Ukraine. Its population was 96 in the 2001 Ukrainian Census. Administratively, it belongs to the Natalivka Rural Council, a local government area.

References

Zaporizhzhia Raion
Rural settlements in Zaporizhzhia Oblast
Populated places established in 1884
1884 establishments in the Russian Empire